People Like Us is the seventh studio album by American country music artist Aaron Tippin, released on July 25, 2000 by Lyric Street Records. His second album for the Lyric Street label, it features his third and final number one single on  the country charts, "Kiss This". Also released from this album were the title track and "Always Was". Tippin's wife, Thea, co-wrote "Kiss This" and "The Best Love We Ever Made", and sang duet vocals on the latter as well as adding the "See Ya!" line at the end of "Kiss This".

Track listing

Personnel
Adapted from the album's liner notes.
Mike Bradley - rebar on "Big Boy Toys"
Melodie Crittenden - background vocals on "Kiss This"
Paul Franklin - pedal steel guitar, lap steel guitar
Aubrey Haynie - fiddle, mandolin
Joanna Janét - background vocals on "Kiss This"
Brent Mason - electric guitar
Steve Nathan - piano, keyboards, Hammond B-3 organ, Wurlitzer electric piano
Kim Parent - background vocals on tracks 1 and 11
John Wesley Ryles - background vocals
Thea Tippin - "See ya" on "Kiss This"
Biff Watson - electric guitar, acoustic guitar, 6 string bass, gut string guitar, shaker; ratchet wrench and "DWC-come-along" on "Big Boy Toys"
Dennis Wilson - background vocals
Lonnie Wilson - drums, drum loops, tambourine
Glenn Worf - bass guitar

Charts

Weekly charts

Year-end charts

References

2000 albums
Lyric Street Records albums
Aaron Tippin albums